The 2011–12 season was Dundee's seventh consecutive season in the Scottish First Division, having been relegated from the Scottish Premier League at the end of the 2004–05 season. Dundee also competed in the Challenge Cup, League Cup and the Scottish Cup. Dundee was promoted to the Scottish Premier League at the end of the campaign after Rangers' liquidation meant a 2nd-place finish was enough to be promoted.

Summary
Dundee finished second in the First Division. They reached the second round of the Challenge Cup, the second round of the League Cup and the fourth round of the Scottish Cup.

Results and fixtures

Pre season

Scottish First Division

Scottish Cup

Scottish League Cup

Scottish Challenge Cup

Player statistics

Captains

Squad 
Last updated 5 May 2012

|}

Disciplinary record

Includes all competitive matches.

Last updated 5 May 2012

Awards

Last updated 5 May 2012

League table

Transfers

Players in

Players out

See also
 List of Dundee F.C. seasons

References

Dundee
Dundee F.C. seasons